Abroad with Two Yanks is a 1944 American comedy film directed by Allan Dwan and starring Helen Walker, William Bendix and Dennis O'Keefe as the title characters. It was Bendix's third and final role in a film as a US Marine and the first of Dwan's three films about the United States Marine Corps.

Premise
Arriving in Australia after the Battle of Guadalcanal, two American Marines compete with each other by stealing the other's Australian girlfriend.  Their intense rivalry leads to their arrest and escape from confinement dressed as women.

Cast
William Bendix  as  Cpl. Biff Koraski
Helen Walker as  Joyce Stuart
Dennis O'Keefe as  Cpl. Jeff Reardon
John Loder as   Sgt. Cyril North
George Cleveland as  Roderick Stuart
Janet Lambert as  Alice
James Flavin as  Sgt. Wiggins
Arthur Hunnicutt as  Arkie

Production

Hal Roach
The film was originally announced as one of Hal Roach's Streamliners titled Yanks Down Under starring William Bendix.  Due to Hal Roach's contract for filming training films for the American Army, the film and Bendix's commitment to it was sold to producer Edward Small with Roach employee Fred Guiol to be credited as a producer. The film was the end of Roach's arrangement with United Artists.

Edward Small
In November 1943 the project was with Edward Small and was called Waltzing Matilda. William Bendix and Dennis O'Keefe were attached to star. The film was to be the second in a two-film contract between O'Keefe and Small, the first being Up in Mabel's Room.

The title was eventually changed to Abroad with Two Yanks. Small later said he mainly bought the story because this title was so appealing.

In January 1944 Edward Small announced the film would be his next for United Artists. Lou Beslow and John Twist were writing the script and Lew Seiler was borrowed from 20th Century Fox to direct. However, by February Allan Dwan, who had just made Up in Mabel's Room for Small, had been signed to direct

Anna Lee was meant to play the female lead. She accepted the part while in Las Vegas for her divorce proceedings. However, on returning to Hollywood she decided that the part was not suitable for her and pulled out of the film. She was replaced by Helen Walker, who was borrowed from Paramount.

Filming started March 1944.

Hedy Lamarr took a photo with Bendix and O'Keefe around the making of the film which Small subsequently issued. Lamarr then sued Small for damages.

Reception
Reviews were strong.  The New York Times said the film was done in "the right spirit".

Proposed sequel
Edward Small wanted to star O'Keefe and Bendix in a series of films and in August announced a sequel Two Yanks in Paris. Charles Rogers and Wilkie Mahoney worked on a story. However no film resulted.

Radio adaptation
The Screen Guild Theater" broadcast a 30-minute radio adaptation of the movie on April 9, 1945, with William Bendix and Dennis O'Keefe reprising their film roles  with Marjorie Reynolds in Helen Walker's role.

See also
List of American films of 1944

References

External links

Review of film at Variety
Complete copy of radio adaptation for Screen Guild Players'' at Internet Archive

1944 films
1940s English-language films
American black-and-white films
United Artists films
Films directed by Allan Dwan
Films about the United States Marine Corps
Films set in Australia
Pacific War films
American comedy films
Military humor in film
Films produced by Edward Small
Films with screenplays by Charley Rogers
1944 comedy films
1940s American films